The South American air forces performs several joint aerial combat training exercises. Among the more important are Cruzex which is hosted by the Brazilian Air Force, salitre hosted by the Chilean Air Force and ceibo hosted by the Argentine Air Force. The goal is to train together in order to respond to a crisis or integrate into United Nations peacekeeping operations as a unified team; the United States Air Force and the Royal Canadian Air Force have also participated in some of these exercises in recent years.

The exercises include combat search and rescue, aerial refueling and combined air operations center training opportunities focused on interoperability.

List of operations

All helicopters are normally provided by the host nation and all the participants include different types of support aircraft.

See also

 Organization of American States
 Inter-American Treaty of Reciprocal Assistance
 System of Cooperation Among the American Air Forces
 Gringo-Gaucho

References

External links

Military aviation exercises
Argentine Air Force
Brazilian Air Force
Chilean Air Force
French Air and Space Force
Peruvian Air Force
Military of Uruguay
Military of Venezuela
Military exercises involving the United States